Joe Haines  (born 4 September 1991)  is a former motorcycle speedway rider from England.

Career history 
Born  in Bolton, England, Haines started his speedway career in 2006 with the Cleveland Bears and then joined the Scunthorpe Scorpions in 2007 in the Conference League winning the League Championship, the Knockout Cup and the Conference Trophy in his first full season.

Wolverhampton Wolves signed Haines just after his sixteenth birthday and immediately loaned him to the Workington Comets for the 2008 season. He also rode for the Boston Barracudas in the Conference League in 2008.

He started the 2009 season as the number eight for Wolverhampton and rode for Rye House Rockets in the Premier League. A serious injury halted his season mid way but he returned to the saddle in September and continued to improve.

In 2010, he rode for King's Lynn Stars in the Premier League while also doubling up with parent club, Wolverhampton in the Elite League. He became the 2010 British Under 21 Champion in April. While riding in Australia during December 2010 he crashed in a race and suffered serious injury, which included a broken shoulder and ribs, a punctured lung, and vertebrae damage.

He went on to ride for Sheffield Tigers in the Premier League before retiring in 2013 aged just 22.

References 

1991 births
Living people
British speedway riders
English motorcycle racers
Sportspeople from Bolton
Workington Comets riders
Scunthorpe Scorpions riders